Stigmella saginella is a moth of the family Nepticulidae. It is found in North America in Ohio, New York, Virginia, Massachusetts, Illinois, Missouri, Pennsylvania, Kentucky, California, Ontario and Quebec.

The wingspan is 4–5.5 mm.

The larvae feed on Quercus species, including Q. prinus, Q. platanoides and Q. alba. They mine the leaves of their host plant. The mine is a whitish linear tract varying in length and width, with a black line of frass running through it. The frass is occasionally more or less dispersed in parts of the mine. The larvae are bright green and the cocoon is usually whitish but occasionally ochraceous.

External links
Nepticulidae of North America
A taxonomic revision of the North American species of Stigmella (Lepidoptera: Nepticulidae)

Nepticulidae
Moths of North America
Moths described in 1861